Georgia Papageorge (born 1941) is a South African installation artist active in the field of earth art.

Life
A native of Simon's Town, Cape Province, Papageorge earned her bachelor's degree in fine arts from the University of South Africa in Pretoria in 1979; she earned a higher diploma in graphics from Pretoria Technikon in 1981.  She turned to art after the death from cancer of her two-year-old daughter.  Much of Papageorge's work explores geological rifts, tying them metaphorically to personal and political upheaval.  Her more recent pieces have explored the Gondwana schism.  In 2003 she completed her work, "Africa Rifting: Lines of Fire, Namibia/Brazil," which featured flowing red material on the sandy beaches of Africa and Brazil.  This work was filmed on September 11, 2001, and presents a powerful contrast to the events in the United States at the time.

References

1941 births
Living people
People from Simon's Town
University of South Africa alumni
South African installation artists